Harry Darbyshire (22 October 1931 – 17 June 1991) was an English footballer who played in the Football League for Leeds United, Halifax Town, Bury and Darlington. He played at centre forward or right half.

References

External links
 

1931 births
1991 deaths
Footballers from Leeds
English footballers
Association football forwards
Association football wing halves
Leeds United F.C. players
Halifax Town A.F.C. players
Bury F.C. players
Darlington F.C. players
English Football League players